Artyom Kozlyuk (born 15 July 1998) is a Uzbekistani swimmer. He competed in the men's 50 metre butterfly event at the 2017 World Aquatics Championships held in Budapest, Hungary.

References

External links
 

1998 births
Living people
Uzbekistani male butterfly swimmers
Place of birth missing (living people)
Swimmers at the 2018 Asian Games
Asian Games competitors for Uzbekistan
21st-century Uzbekistani people